Kolec Kraja (born 1934) is a former Albanian football who played for Partizani Tirana and the Albania national team.

Club career
He won the National Championship six times between 1957 and 1964 with Partizani Tirana. He scored Partizani Tirana's first goal in a European competition, against IFK Norrköping in the 1962–63 European Cup. which was also the first goal scored by an Albanian in a European competition.

International career
He made his debut for Albania in a September 1957 friendly match against China and earned a total of 3 caps, scoring 2 goals. His final international was a June 1963 Olympic Games qualification match against Bulgaria.

Honours
Albanian Superliga: 6
 1957, 1958, 1959, 1961, 1963, 1964

References

External links

1934 births
Living people
Association football forwards
Albanian footballers
Albania international footballers
FK Partizani Tirana players
Kategoria Superiore players
Albanian football managers
FK Partizani Tirana managers